Village Preservation (formerly the Greenwich Village Society for Historic Preservation, or GVSHP) is a non-profit organization which advocates for the preservation of architecture and culture in several neighborhoods of Lower Manhattan, New York. Since it began in 1980, it has engaged in efforts to attain landmark status for a variety of sites like the Stonewall Inn and Webster Hall. The organization and its Executive Director, Andrew Berman, have been described as influential in New York real estate, while some of its activities to prevent development and to support restrictive zoning have attracted criticism.

History

The Greenwich Village Society for Historic Preservation was founded in 1980 as the Greenwich Village Trust for Historic Preservation (GVT). In 1982, Regina Kellerman, a prominent architectural historian and co-founder of GVT, was named as its first executive director, and GVT moved its operations to the Salmagundi Club at 47 Fifth Avenue. In 1984, GVT changed its name to Greenwich Village Society for Historic Preservation, and began using the brand "Village Preservation" in 2019. Since 1999, GVSHP has operated from the Neighborhood Preservation Center, the former rectory of St. Mark's Church in-the-Bowery, on East 11th Street, and increased its focus on the East Village since moving its office to that neighborhood.

The organization has been characterized as a NIMBY ("not in my back yard") group.

In the early 2000s, the organization sought to prevent owners of 13 old rowhouses from demolishing the houses or altering them. The organization also called for historical landmark status for buildings in the Southeast of Greenwich Village. The organization has also called for "downzoning" neighbourhoods, which means the imposition of more restrictive zoning regulations in neighborhoods.

In late 2000s, the organization opposed a proposed expansion of St. Vincent Catholic Medical Center, a hospital in Greenwich Village, with Andrew Berman arguing that the plan would be "a blow to the distinctive historic character of Greenwich Village." The hospital said that the plan would modernize its facility, enabling it to provide effective medical care and to improve the financial situation of the hospital. The proposed development entailed the demolishment of nine buildings to construct the hospital along with a high-rise apartment tower. The Landmarks Preservation Commissioners of New York City unanimously opposed the hospital expansion plans and the project was not pursued, which prompted a celebration by GVSHP. In 2010, St. Vincent's filed for bankruptcy and closed down, laying off more than 1,000 staff members. The Greenwich Village Society for Historic Preservation said that it had "support[ed] the hospital to the best of our ability" and had provided the hospital with a "community alternative plan" to re-build and modernize.

In the 2010s, the organization sought to block new construction on the Gansevoort Street, where low-rise meatpacking buildings stand. The organization also sought to block housing developments near Hudson River Park. The organization was involved in lawsuits to prevent New York University from expanding its campus in New York City. The organization also fought for historic landmark status for buildings owned by New York University, which would have prevented re-development by the university of the buildings. In 2011, GVSHP was among the neighborhood critics of the owners of a Mexican restaurant in Greenwich Village that painted over the faded signage above the entrance of the venue that once housed the "Fat Black Pussycat Theatre", a club that hosted Bob Dylan, Mama Cass Elliot, Richie Havens and other famous entertainers in the 1950s and 1960s.

In 2020s, the organization advocated against rezoning of SoHo and NoHo to allow construction of thousands of new apartments with a small share at below-market rents. The plan was rejected by the Community Board by a 49-1 vote. In 2020, New York mayor Bill De Blasio proposed a rezoning plan for SoHo that would allow construction of 3,200 new housing units, 25% of which would be designated as affordable housing, while protecting existing rent-controlled properties." GVSHP said that the construction of new housing would raise prices and make the wealthy neighborhood of SoHo less diverse. Andrew Berman stated, "This upzoning approach of super luxury towers with a small set-aside for affordable units is bad for New York City, bad for our neighborhoods, and bad for affordability,”

In 2021, the New York City Council voted to approve the construction of 3,500 housing units (one quarter of which was devoted to affordable housing) in SoHo and NoHo in a 43-5 vote. Village Preservation lobbied against the construction project.

Work
GVSHP holds a number of events, such as lectures, walking tours, panel discussions, and house tours. The organization's primary annual fundraiser is the Village House Tour, held on the first Sunday each May. Its major members’ event is the Village Awards and Annual Meeting in June.

Landmarks designation efforts

Although a large portion of the Village was designated in 1969 as part of the Greenwich Village Historic District, many buildings outside the district's boundaries are unprotected. During the decade between 2003 and 2013, GVSHP helped secure landmark designation of over 1,250 buildings, as well as community-scaled "contextual rezonings" of nearly 100 blocks.

Among their notable accomplishments are the listing of the Stonewall Inn on the National Register of Historic Places in 1999 and designation as part of the Stonewall National Monument in 2016, the first U.S. national monument or city landmark based upon LGBT history. Their other accomplishments include landmark designation for the Meatpacking District and most of the South Village; the first extensions of the Greenwich Village Historic District since 1969; first-of-their-kind landmark designation of sites such as Webster Hall, I.M. Pei’s Silver Towers, and the former Bell Telephone Labs/Westbeth Artist Housing, and saving homes and studios of artists such as Frank Stella and Willem de Kooning from demolition.

Some of its more notable efforts include:
2019Three more LGBT historic site proposed for designation by the society are granted individual landmark status — The LGBT Community Services Center, the for Gay Activists Alliance Firehouse, and the former home of Caffé Cino
2017827-831 Broadway designated as an individual landmark by the NYC Landmarks Preservation Commission.
2016Sullivan-Thompson Historic District designated by the NYC Landmarks Preservation Commission.  
2016Secured protections against any future "air rights" transfers from the Hudson River Park that would have had the potential to increase, by 1.5 million square feet, the amount of development permitted in Greenwich Village's westernmost blocks.  
2015 - Stonewall Inn designated as an individual landmark by the NYC Landmarks Preservation Commission, the first landmark to be designated based on LGBT history.  
2012East Village/Lower East Side and East 10th Street Historic District designated the first new historic districts in the East Village since 1969.  
2011Westbeth Building declared an official City landmark (added to State & National Register of Historic Places since 2009)
2009East Village rezoning passed by NYC Council
2009Webster Hall designated as an individual landmark by the NYC Landmarks Preservation Commission
2008Silver Towers designated as an individual landmark by the NYC Landmarks Preservation Commission
1999, 2002, 2009NoHo Historic District (Main, East, and Extension, respecticely) designated by the NYC Landmarks Preservation Commission
2006Weehawken Street Historic District designated by NYC Landmarks Preservation Commission
2004Hamilton-Holly House at 4 St. Marks Place and 127-131 MacDougal Street designated as individual landmarks by the NYC Landmarks Preservation Commission
2003Gansevoort Market Historic District designated by NYC Landmarks Preservation Commission
2002Gansevoort Market named one of Seven to Save by Preservation League of New York State
1999Stonewall Inn added to National Register of Historic Places (joint effort with Organization of Lesbian and Gay Architects and Designers)

Selected honors and awards
2013Vanity Fair's “Hall of Fame”: GVSHP's Executive Director Andrew Berman was named to the magazine's “Hall of Fame” for being “the pesky David to the Goliath developers who have come to define post-millennial Manhattan … savvy and pugnacious enough to recognize that there is no respite for the preservationist, ever, from those who would make the Village ‘bigger, glassier, newer.’”
2008The New York Observer's “100 Most Powerful People in New York Real Estate”: The society's Executive Director Andrew Berman was recognized by the Observer in 2008 for his efforts to block housing developments in Greenwich Village.
2007The Preservation League of New York State's Excellence in Historic Preservation Award: Of GVSHP, PLNYS said, “The Greenwich Village Society for Historic Preservation’s efforts to build grassroots support, and to monitor and inform the decisions of New York City agencies should serve as an inspiration to other preservation organizations. The society recently achieved a number of preservation goals that for decades had proved elusive. From the implementation of measures to protect the historic buildings and character of the Far West Village and Greenwich Village waterfront, to the designation of the Gansevoort Market Historic District, once-endangered buildings are now protected.”
2006The Village Voice's “Best Greenwich Village Defender” in “Best of NYC 2006": The Village Voice writes that “It’s been a big year in the push to preserve the Village, thanks largely to the Greenwich Village Society for Historic Preservation. The group’s vigilant director, Andrew Berman, has exhibited a knack for stopping 'out of context' buildings from sprouting up on quaint, historic streets, despite the red-hot development pressures."
2006New York Magazine’s “Influentials 2006”: New York Magazine says of Berman, "He persuaded the City Council to stop a spate of 'out of context' buildings in their tracks. Now he’s taking on NYU, determined not to let the university take over the neighborhood in its expansion.”
2006New York Landmarks Conservancy's Lucy G. Moses Organizational Excellence Award: The NYLC established the Lucy G. Moses award to "recognize the property owners, builders, artisans, and designers who renew the beauty and utility of New York City’s distinctive architecture."

Research and Resources
In 2017, GVSHP launched a Civil Rights and Social Justice map, which marks notable sites relevant to various social justice movements over the years.
GVSHP launched the East Village Building Blocks interactive map after 10 years of research, which documents construction information on every building in the East Village.
In 2019, The society released an interactive map for the 50th anniversary of the Greenwich Village Historic District designation in 1969. The map shows historic images of buildings in Greenwich Village compared to what they look like in the present day.
In 2019, GVSHP collaborated with Google Arts & Culture to create virtual reality walking tours including themes of Latinx History, Social Justice, LGBTQ+ and Trailblazing Women.

Historic districts
 
The following designated historic districts fall within the society's purview, followed by the year in which they were designated in parentheses:

Charlton-King-Vandam Historic District (1966)
MacDougal-Sullivan Gardens Historic District (1967)
Greenwich Village Historic District (1969) and Extension I (2006) (includes Stonewall National Register District) and Extension II (2010)
St. Mark's Historic District (1969) and extension (1984)
NoHo Historic District (1999) and extension (2008)
NoHo East Historic District (2003)
Gansevoort Market Historic District (2003)
Weehawken Street Historic District (2006)
Noho Historic District Extension I (2008)
East 10th Street Historic District (2010)
Soho Historic District Extension (2010)
East Village/Lower East Side Historic District (2012)
South Village Historic District (2013)
Sullivan-Thompson Historic District (2016)

See also
New York City Landmarks Preservation Commission
List of New York City Designated Landmarks in Manhattan below 14th Street
National Register of Historic Places listings in Manhattan below 14th Street

References

External links

Lower East Side Preservation Initiative

Greenwich Village
_
1980 establishments in New York City